"Any Day Now" is the second single by Canadian band The Watchmen from their fourth studio album, Silent Radar.

In 2011, the song was featured in the opening montage of Hockey Night in Canada in the first game in Winnipeg of the returning Winnipeg Jets.

Charts

References

External links

1998 singles
Song recordings produced by Adam Kasper
1998 songs